The Daimler Majestic Major DQ450 is a large luxury saloon produced by Daimler in Coventry, England between November 1960 and 1968. It was fitted with a 4,561 cc V8 engine and was offered as a much more powerful supplement to their then current Daimler Majestic.

A substantially lengthened limousine version of the same chassis and bodyshell, the Daimler DR450, was available from 1961 until the V8 engine ended production.

Introduction

Though the Major was announced and displayed on 20 October 1959 at the London Motor Show, the car on the show stand was a prototype and production did not get under way until November 1960. It was offered as a supplement alongside the slightly shorter 3.8-litre Majestic released in 1958. Both cars used the same chassis and bodyshell, the Major having an extended boot as well as the new engine which was lighter and much more powerful.

Motor Sport magazine described the Major as having "sports car performance", while The Autocar stated that it appeared "almost as a sports saloon" and that it was stable directionally at high speeds and could be cornered safely very fast for such a large car.

It was faster than a Mark X Jaguar up to  despite its   bulk, it has been said. Jaguar tested the engine in a Mark X which attained .

External differences from the Majestic included a D motif on top of the bonnet, cast-in V symbols on the ventilation air intakes, six inches added to the length of the car which gave it a longer boot and longer bumper returns, and twin exhaust pipes. Front seats could be supplied as individual adjustable seats or as a bench.

Engine

By comparison a Jaguar Mark X also claimed 220hp but used a different scale of measurement.

Chassis and body
The chassis of Majestic Major was an evolution of the design introduced in 1937 with the Daimler New Fifteen. As with the New Fifteen and several derivatives in between, the Majestic Major had a cruciform-braced box-section frame with conventional coil-sprung independent front suspension and a live rear axle on semi-elliptic leaf springs. As with the Majestic, there were four-wheel Dunlop disc brakes with a vacuum servo.

The combination of an imported Borg-Warner DG (Detroit Gear) 250M automatic transmission, power steering and Dunlop's power disc brakes on all wheels made the Major in those respects a mechanically advanced car for its time. Its body, however, was originally designed for the Majestic by Daimler subsidiary, the old coachbuilding firm Carbodies and they provided the bodies in conjunction with Park Sheet Metal. They were finished in cellulose paints allowing a selection of colours not available in the new synthetic finishes used by Jaguar. They were built at Browns Lane on separate hand-moved lines.

The car was not one for manoeuvering in tight spaces; 4.5 turns lock to lock were required. Power steering, initially optional, became standard after October 1964.

Late versions were supplied with a limited slip differential and an alternator.

The bodies were of all steel construction. Despite being coated with zinc phosphate, they rusted more rapidly than expected of coachwork on a Daimler chassis.

Performance
A "touring" fuel consumption of 16.9 miles per gallon (imperial) was recorded. On the home market, as tested, the car cost £3166 including taxes of £955.

Jaguar, which had taken over Daimler in 1960, announced their similarly equipped if less powerful new Jaguar Mark X saloon the following month priced at exactly 75% of this Daimler, £2,393 including taxes of £753.

In the spring of 1963 The Times' Motoring Correspondent tested the Daimler and found its top speed to be 123 mph. Acceleration times (with the Jaguar Mark 10 results in brackets) were 0–30 mph, 3.8sec., (4.3), 0–60, 10sec. (12.1), and 0–100, 30.8sec. (31.1).

Notes

References
Citations

Sources

External links

 Daimler Majestic Major
 Neo Scale Models have produced (2011) a 1:43 resin molded model of the Majestic Major.

Majestic Major
Cars introduced in 1960
Cars discontinued in 1968
Luxury vehicles